My Song Your Song is the third studio album by Ikimono-gakari, released in Japan on December 24, 2008. The song, "Blue Bird", was known for the third opening sequence in Naruto: Shippuden.

Track listing

Oricon Chart (Japan)

External links
 My Song Your Song album at Ikimonogakari official site

2008 albums
Ikimono-gakari albums